The plain martin has been split into two species:
 Brown-throated martin (Riparia paludicola), found in Africa and Madagascar
 Grey-throated martin (Riparia chinensis), found in Asia

Animal common name disambiguation pages